Odd Rode is a civil parish in the unitary authority of Cheshire East and the ceremonial county of Cheshire, England. It borders the Staffordshire parish of Kidsgrove, and includes the settlements of:
 Scholar Green
 Mow Cop
 Mount Pleasant
 Rode Heath
 Thurlwood
 The Bank

The population of the civil parish as of the 2011 census was 5,442.

Of particular note in the area is Rode Hall, seat of the Wilbraham family.

Churches
There are three Anglican (CofE) churches in the parish: All Saints', Scholar Green; St. Luke's, Mow Cop; and The Church of the Good Shepherd, Rode Heath.  The churches have long histories and host services and events throughout the year. The current incumbent priest is the Rev. Philip Atkinson.

Toponymy
"Rode" (Old English rod) means "(wood)land cleared for farming".  There are several competing explanations of the meaning of "Odd": "Old"; "Odd" (Middle English odde) in the sense of "the third of three", i.e. to contrast this Rode with North Rode and Rode Heath; "Hood's" (Middle English hod), from the name of a thirteenth-century tenant of the manor; "Odda's", from an Old English forename.

See also

 Listed buildings in Odd Rode

References

External links

Civil parishes in Cheshire